4-Chlorobenzaldehyde is an organic compound with the chemical formula C7H5ClO. It can produced by the oxidation of 4-chlorobenzyl alcohol. It can be further oxidized to 4-chlorobenzoic acid. It will react with malononitrile to form 4-chlorobenzylidenylmalononitrile. 4-Chlorobenzaldehyde reacts with benzylamine to produce N-(4-chlorobenzylidenyl)benzylamine。

References

Chlorobenzenes
Benzaldehydes